The following is a list of selected mountains in Nagaland, ordered by height:

List

See also 
 List of mountains in India

References

External links